The Roman Catholic Party Netherlands (in Dutch: Rooms Katholieke Partij Nederland, RKPN) was a Dutch orthodox catholic political party. The RKPN played a marginal role in Dutch politics.

Party History
The RKPN was founded by former members of the Catholic People's Party who were upset with what they saw as the liberal course of their party. In reaction, they founded the RKPN. In the 1972 the party got one seat, which was taken by Klaas Beuker, who also was the party's chair. In 1974 a conflict between Beuker and the party board, caused him to continue as an independent MP. The party unsuccessfully entered in the 1977 elections.

Ideology & Issues
The RKPN was an orthodox catholic testimonial party in contrast to the pragmatic and liberal course of the Catholic People's Party. The party took the Ten Commandments as their main perspective. The RKPN followed the conservative course of Pope Paul VI.

The RKPN wanted to strengthen catholic schools and youth work. It wanted to government to act against euthanasia and abortion.

Support & Leadership
This table shows the RKPN's results in elections to the House of Representatives and Senate, as well as the party's political leadership: the fractievoorzitter, is the chair of the parliamentary party and the lijsttrekker is the party's top candidate in the general election, these posts are normally taken by the party's leader.

Electorate
The party was mainly supported by Catholics who followed more conservative bishops like Simonis.

International Comparison
The RKPN, a testimonial party can best be compared to the Dutch orthodox Protestant SGP. Internationally it is comparable to small orthodox catholic parties like the Irish Christian Solidarity Party.

References

Catholic political parties
Defunct political parties in the Netherlands
Confessional parties in the Netherlands
Defunct Christian political parties
Conservative parties in the Netherlands